Ordaz is a surname. Notable people with the surname include:

Diego de Ordaz (1480–1532), Spanish conquistador, participated in the exploration and conquest of Mexico
Diego Ordaz (born 1984), Mexican football defender
Gustavo Díaz Ordaz (1911–1979), served as the President of Mexico from 1964 to 1970
Luis Ordaz (born 1975), free agent utility infielder in Major League Baseball
Tomás Álvarez de Acevedo Ordaz, twice interim governor of the Kingdom of Chile in 1780 and between 1787 and 1788
Yolanda Ordaz de la Cruz, Mexican journalist killed in 2011

See also
Gustavo Díaz Ordaz, Tamaulipas, a municipality in the Mexican state of Tamaulipas
Lic. Gustavo Díaz Ordaz International Airport (IATA: PVR, ICAO: MMPR) is an international airport at Puerto Vallarta, Jalisco
Puerto Ordaz, a city which, together with the older settlement of San Felix, forms Ciudad Guayana in Bolívar State, eastern Venezuela
Villa Díaz Ordaz, a town and municipality in Oaxaca in south-western Mexico